Sir Claud Severn  (Chinese Translated Name: 施勳) (1869–1933) was a British colonial administrator. Severn joined the colonial civil service in British Malaya in 1894 and worked under the Governor of the Straits Settlements. In 1912, he became Colonial Secretary of Hong Kong and remained in the post until 1925. During this period, Severn governed Hong Kong twice as acting administrator during transition periods between Governors.

Early life

Sir Claud Severn was born on 9 September 1869 in Adelaide, South Australia, to Walter Severn (1830－1904) (at one time British Consul in Rome) and Mary Dalrymple Fergusson (1845-1916). His mother was the daughter of Sir Charles Dalrymple Fergusson, 5th Baronet.

Severn went to St Peter's College, Adelaide and studied Latin and chemistry at the University of Adelaide. He later graduated from Selwyn College, Cambridge with a BA in 1890 and MA in 1913.

Colonial service
Having joined the Foreign Service in 1891 as a temporary library clerk, Severn was appointed, in 1894, private secretary to Sir Charles B H Mitchell, then Governor of the Straits Settlements.  After a period of 17 years in the colonial administration of the Federated Malay States including four years as private secretary to Governor Sir John Anderson, he was appointed Colonial Secretary in Hong Kong, leading the administration under Governor Sir Frederick Lugard.  He was acting governor of Hong Kong for just over a year during a transition between governors from 1918 to 1919.  It was 1918 when he entertained the visiting George Morrison, the highly influential Political Advisor to the President of the Chinese Republic, who related that the appointment of the "Buffoon of Hong Kong" was "one of the jokes of our time".

In 1920, at 50, he married Margaret Annie Bullock, the daughter of Thomas Lowndes Bullock who from 1899 was Professor of Chinese at the University of Oxford, and they had two sons and a daughter.

Both Severn and Governor Sir Reginald Stubbs retired in 1925, victims of the general strike which all but destroyed Hong Kong that year and for which they were criticised by James Jamieson,  British Consul General in Canton.  Jamieson saw them as out of touch and out of date, unable to converse in Chinese and ignorant of republican China.

Later life

After his service in Hong Kong, Severn departed for Britain and died at the Old Rectory, Ewelme, near Oxford, on  8 April 1933.

Memory

Severn Road, which is located on Mount Gough in Hong Kong, was named after him.

Honours

 CMG 1917
 KBE 1923

References

1869 births
1933 deaths
Alumni of Selwyn College, Cambridge
Chief Secretaries of Hong Kong
People from Adelaide
Companions of the Order of St Michael and St George
Knights Commander of the Order of the British Empire